Sanma is a province located in the Northern part of the nation of Vanuatu, occupying the nation's largest island, Espiritu Santo, which is located approximately 2,500 km northeast of Sydney, Australia.

The name Sanma is derived from the initial letters of the main islands of (Espiritu) SANto and MAlo.

Population
It has a population of 45,860 and an area of 4,248 km2. The provincial capital is Luganville. Other centers of population include Hog Harbour, Port Olry, Nakere, Ipaiato, Tasiriki, Tasmate and Malao.

Sanma Provincial Day falls on 23 September annually. All Sanma Citizens including friends celebrate this special occasion wherever they are domestically or internationally.

Overview
Sanma provincial council is responsible for running the daily affairs of the province. The council is elected every four years, the party which has the vast majority of seats sets up the provincial government. The head of the provincial government is the President of Sanma province. The headquarters of the province is located in the town centre of Luganville.

Critics had blamed the provincial government for ill management of the provincial affairs during the past few years. For example, over the last few years, poor management had culminated in a considerable amount of litigations. This has therefore cost the council a fortune as regards legal fees. One of the avowed aims of this recent council at Sanma province is to ensure transparency, and good governance.

Islands

References

 
Provinces of Vanuatu
States and territories established in 1994